AMT Coffee was founded in 1993 by Alistair McCallum-Toppin and his two brothers Angus and Allan. AMT Coffee is a chain of coffeehouses that are located in airports, hospitals and railway stations.[1]

AMT Coffee was the first national coffee company in the UK to use 100% bio-compostable cups and lids, 100% fairtrade coffee and 100% organic milk, as well as the first to be accredited with the Fair Tax Mark.[2] In March 2011, Ethical Consumer named it the most ethical coffee chain.[3]

In November 2022 it was announced that AMT was being bought out of administration by SSP Group.

Locations

AMT Coffee had over 50 coffee bars across the United Kingdom and Ireland.

See also
 List of coffeehouse chains

References

Coffeehouses and cafés in the United Kingdom
Restaurants established in 1992
1992 establishments in the United Kingdom